Statue of Ignacio Vallarta may refer to:

Statue of Ignacio Vallarta (Guadalajara), Jalisco, Mexico
Statue of Ignacio Vallarta (Puerto Vallarta), Jalisco, Mexico